The Iranian Blood Transfusion Organization or acronymly IBTO is the highest and only decision-making authority in the field of supply and distribution of healthy blood and blood products in Iran. This organization was established in July 31, 1974.

History
Before 1945, sporadic blood transfusions were performed in different hospitals in Iran, but there is no reliable evidence in this regard. In 1952, the "Army Blood Bank" was established by "Dr. Mohammad Ali Shams" and blood transfusion center of Red Lion and Sun Society was established by "Dr. Ahmad Azhir" and both started to work simultaneously.

In the field of blood products, the "Army Blood Center" from 1961 onwards provided cellular products (dense red blood cells and dense platelets) and plasma (Cryoprecipitate and fresh frozen plasma) to a limited extent, and in the same years in collaboration with the Pasteur Institute of Iran took action to purify blood plasma and prepare its products.

With the establishment of the "Iranian Blood Transfusion Organization" in 1974, several years of efforts were achieved and blood transfusion was legalized in Iran. In fact, before 1974, several centers in Iran with limited facilities in hospitals, the army and the Red Lion and Sun Society were working to provide blood to patients in need, but with the establishment of the "Iranian Blood Transfusion Organization" by Fereydoun Ala in 1975, this system entered a new phase. Professor Fereydoun Ala is the founder of the "Iranian Blood Transfusion Organization" and it can be said that he is the most experienced employee of the Blood Transfusion Organization.

Currently, the "Iranian Blood Transfusion Organization" is the highest and only decision-making authority in the field of supply and distribution of blood and healthy blood products in Iran, and all decisions related to blood products are directly related to this organization.

Initially, all the expenses of this organization were provided from the budget of the whole country in the form of aid. In July 17, 1979, After the victory of the Islamic Revolutionin Iran and following a general revision of the country's budget, the Blood Transfusion Organization became a government agency affiliated with the Ministry of Health and became subject to the government's general regulations. With the beginning of the Iran–Iraq War in 1980 and the increasing need for blood in the country, the activities of the organization grew significantly and the need for coordination between all departments related to blood transfusion medicine was evident. Therefore, with the approval of the Islamic Consultative Assembly on May 23, 1984, the "Iranian Blood Transfusion Organization" was announced as the sole custodian of blood supply and blood products in Iran. After the approval of the Articles of Association, to form the executive structure of the organization, three deputies of "production and technical", "research and education", "administration and finance" were designed and implemented. The organization was governed by a five-member High Council composed of experts selected by the Minister of Health, Treatment and Medical Education.

In 1995, the plan of the country's blood supply network was approved and implemented by the Supreme Council. Based on this plan, the "Iranian Blood Transfusion Organization", in the form of nine bases of educational regions, will carry out the programs and responsibilities that are prepared and coordinated in the central headquarters of the organization.

The establishment day of the "Iranian Blood Transfusion Organization"  on July 31, 1974, has been registered in the national calendar of Iran as the "National Day of Blood Donation".

Nowaday, forty-six years after the establishment of the "Iranian Blood Transfusion Organization", Iranians have donated 52 million units of blood since the establishment of the organization. At present, the "Iranian Blood Transfusion Organization" has made Iran one of the leading countries in the Eastern Mediterranean region in terms of blood donation index, and with 100% voluntary and unannounced blood donation, it has the first rank in blood donation in this region.

Activities in the country
In 1978, in addition to Tehran, blood transfusion centers were established by the "Iranian Blood Transfusion Organization"  in 3 cities of Shiraz, Mashhad and Ahvaz. According to the latest statistics of 2013, all blood transfusion centers, including 124 permanent blood collection centers, 32 collection and processing center and 58 blood transfusion centers, are a total of 214 centers, which operate in 31 provinces of Iran.

At present, the capitals of all the provinces of Iran have blood transfusion centers in which there are test sections for screening on donated blood, preparation of products and quality control. Also, 35 counties of Iran have blood transfusion centers that are equipped with facilities for all product preparation processes and screening tests on every donation unit for infection with Hepatitis B virus, Hepatitis C virus, HIV virus and serological testing for Syphilis and other necessary tests.

Duties

The main duty is to provide adequate blood supply and blood products (cellular and plasma); healthy, with excellent quality to maintain and promote health and improve the quality of life of patients in Iran and hold the superiority of the Eastern Mediterranean region. Other duties include:

 Encourage and collect blood donation volunteers
 Implementing educational programs to make people aware of blood donation
 Expansion of blood supply network throughout the country
 Establishment of mobile units and local bases in different areas of cities for blood collection
 Perform safety tests and grouping to prepare blood and blood products
 Distribution of blood and its products to health centers, hospitals and other organizations and institutions
 Production of various blood products (plasma, cellular and similar) as defined by the Ministry of Health and Medical Education
 Preparation and implementation of educational programs required by the medical group and affiliated medicine within the scope of the organization's duties in accordance with the educational rules and regulations of the country
 Scientific researches in the field of determining and completing appropriate methods for preparation of blood and plasma products, specific researches in the fields of Immunohaematology, Immunochemistry and chemistry of proteins and related fields, and conducting clinical and basic researches
 Tissues grouping for organ transplantation and white blood cell transfer
 Diagnosis of blood coagulation disorders
 Determining the standard conditions for collecting, storing blood and plasma fractions, equipment used, issuing cards and medical conditions allowed for blood donation
 Material and spiritual encouragement of blood and plasma donors for their cooperation and preparation of some products

Organizational chart
Organizational structure of the "Iranian Blood Transfusion Organization" is as follows:

Criteria for blood donation
The Iranian Blood Transfusion Organization has defined these criteria for voluntary blood donation:

 Minimum age 18 years and maximum 60 years
 Minimum weight 50 kg
 Blood donation intervals of 56 days with a maximum of four donations per year for men and three donations per year for women
 Having an identity card

The fate of donated blood
The "Iranian Blood Transfusion Organization" use the donated bloods and its products to treat the following:

 Premature children
 Injuries
 Cancers
 Heart diseases
 Problems during childbirth
 Surgeries
 Liver and kidney diseases
 Sickle cell disease
 Leukemia
 Anemia of chronic disease
 Thalassemia major
 Haemophilia

Facts about blood donation
According to the "Iranian Blood Transfusion Organization's" educational brochures:

 2 out of every 100 people in Iran are blood donors
 Blood cannot be made and the only source of supply is blood donation
 One unit of donated blood can help treat three people
 Treats which needs blood transfusion, requires an average of three units of blood and its product
 Each donor can donate whole blood or other blood components such as plasma, platelets and red blood cells
 Blood and its products have special storage times and conditions. The red blood cell product can usually be stored in the refrigerator temperature for up to 35 days.

See also
 Iranian Red Crescent Society
 Kidney Foundation of Iran

References

External links
 IBTO ENGLISH
 Introduction to Iranian Blood Transfusion Organization and Blood Safety in Iran
  The Scientific Journal of Iranian Blood Transfusion Organization
 WHO: World Blood Donor Day is in the official calendar of events for Iran
 Iranian Blood Transfusion Organization (IBTO) Newsletter – November 2019
 Iran National Blood Transfusion Policy; Goals, Objectives and Milestones for 2011-2015
 IRNA: Blood donated in Iran safest in world
 Introduction to Iranian Blood Transfusion Organization and Blood Safety in Iran

1974 establishments in Iran
Medical and health organisations based in Iran
Government agencies of Iran